The 1917–18 season was the 41st Scottish football season in which Dumbarton competed at national level, entering the Scottish Football League. in addition Dumbarton played in the Dumbartonshire Cup and the Dumbartonshire Charity Cup.

Scottish League

This was the fourth season of war-time football, where the playing of all national competitions, other than the Scottish League, was suspended. Membership of the League was reduced from 20 to 18, with Aberdeen, Dundee and Raith Rovers withdrawing and Clydebank being admitted. Dumbarton's 8th place finish with 34 points (22 behind champions Rangers) was their best performance since the 1893-94 season.

Dumbartonshire Cup
Dumbarton re-entered the Dumbartonshire Cup for the first time in three seasons, but lost out to Clydebank in the final, which was held over until the beginning  of the 1918-19 season.

Dumbartonshire Charity Cup
Dumbarton retained the Dumbartonshire Charity Cup for the second successive year by beating Renton in the final.

Charity matches
During the season two charity matches were played for the benefit of the Red Cross War Fund, both being won, scoring 8 goals for the loss of 4.

Player statistics

Squad 

|}

Source:

Transfers

Players in

Players out 

Source:

In addition Robert Catterson, Thomas Hamilton and Joseph Tait all played their final 'first XI' games in Dumbarton colours.

References

Dumbarton F.C. seasons
Scottish football clubs 1917–18 season